Vitaliy Anichkin (born 11 November 1988 in Oral) is a Kazakhstani race walker. He competed in the 50 kilometres walk event at the 2012 Summer Olympics.  He competed in the 20 km walk at the 2013 World Championships.

References

External links
 

Kazakhstani male racewalkers
1988 births
Living people
Olympic athletes of Kazakhstan
Athletes (track and field) at the 2012 Summer Olympics
World Athletics Championships athletes for Kazakhstan
People from Oral, Kazakhstan
21st-century Kazakhstani people